Rachael Leigh Cook (born October 4, 1979) is an American actress and model. She has starred in the films The Baby-Sitters Club (1995), She's All That (1999), and Josie and the Pussycats (2001), and in the television series Into the West and Perception. She is also the voice behind various characters in Robot Chicken and Tifa Lockhart in the Final Fantasy series, starting with the English version of the film Final Fantasy VII: Advent Children.

Early life
Rachael Leigh Cook was born in Minneapolis, Minnesota, the daughter of Thomas Howard Cook, a social worker and former stand-up comedian, and JoAnn, a cooking instructor and weaver. She is of part-Italian descent. Cook first appeared in a public service announcement for foster care at seven years of age, and began working as a child print model at the age of 10, including nationwide advertisements for Target and appearing on the boxes of Milk-Bone dog biscuits.  She attended Clara Barton Open School, Laurel Springs School, and Minneapolis South High School.

Career

Cook began auditioning for acting work at the age of 14. She made her screen debut as an actress in the 1995 film The Baby-Sitters Club. She also played a role in the adventure film Tom and Huck, released in December 1995. In 1996, her modeling agency sent her to star in a short film, 26 Summer Street. In 1997, Cook appeared in a leading role in the film Country Justice as a 15-year-old rape victim who is impregnated by her rapist.

In 1999, Cook starred in her breakout role in the sleeper hit film She's All That, a romantic comedy that so far is the most financially successful film of her career. In 2000, she starred opposite Elijah Wood in the well-received The Bumblebee Flies Anyway. She took the lead role in 2001's Josie and the Pussycats, which turned out to be a box office failure, although it has since become a cult classic.

In 2000, she was the cover girl for the U.S. March/April issue of FHM.  She also starred in the music video for New Found Glory's 2000 single "Dressed to Kill". In 2002, she was ranked No. 26 in Stuff magazine's "102 Sexiest Women in the World". In 2003, she starred in the film 11:14 as Cheri. She also appeared as a main cast member in the 2005 television miniseries Into the West produced by Steven Spielberg. In 2006, she appeared in the music video for Daniel Powter's "Love You Lately".

In 2007, Cook was seen in the big screen adaptation of Nancy Drew. She played the female lead in the independent sports drama The Final Season. She has appeared in numerous episodes of the Seth Green comedies Titan Maximum and Robot Chicken. In 2008, she guest-starred as Abigail Lytar in two third-season episodes of the USA Network series Psych. She reprised the role in the following season.

In February 2010, Cook signed on to play the female lead role in Fox TV's comedy pilot Nirvana.  She had a role in the Western horror film Vampire, the English-language feature debut of Japanese director Iwai Shunji. In 2012, Cook signed on to play the female lead role in the TNT crime drama series Perception opposite Eric McCormack.  She starred in the independent film Broken Kingdom, which was directed by her husband Daniel Gillies. She also appeared in a Funny or Die sketch with Chad Michael Murray.

Cook starred in the Hallmark Channel original film Summer Love in 2016. In the same year, she starred in another Hallmark film, Autumn In the Vineyard, followed by its sequel Summer in the Vineyard in 2017.  2017 also saw Cook develop, star and executive produce the Hallmark Channel film Frozen in Love, which was broadcast in January 2018 as part of the channel's 'Winterfest' season of programming.

Cook provided the voice for Chelsea Cunningham on the Kids' WB animated series Batman Beyond and in the animated film Batman Beyond: Return of the Joker.  Cook voiced Tifa Lockhart in the video games Kingdom Hearts II, Dirge of Cerberus: Final Fantasy VII and Dissidia 012 Final Fantasy, as well as the CG movie Final Fantasy VII Advent Children.  In 2011, she voiced the character of Jaesa Willsaam in the MMO game, Star Wars: The Old Republic. Cook's latest voice-over role is for the video game Yakuza in which she voices the role of Reina. In 2020 Cook appeared in the fifteenth season of Criminal Minds playing the role of Max in the final episodes of the series.

Cook owns her own production company, Ben's Sister Productions (in reference to her younger brother Ben Cook). She produced and starred in the film Love, Guaranteed which debuted on Netflix on September 3, 2020.

Public service
Cook first gained national attention in 1997, when she was featured in the famous This Is Your Brain on Drugs PSA television advertisement, in which she proceeds to destroy a kitchen with a frying pan.

In 2011, she was selected by the Obama administration as a Champion of Change for Arts Education.

In June 2012, she began to award a small scholarship to students between ages 14 and 19. The scholarship helps pay for career classes, mentoring programs, and other school fees.

In 2017, Rachael Leigh Cook reprised her "This Is Your Brain on Drugs" role twenty years later for a PSA by the Drug Policy Alliance critiquing the War on Drugs and its contribution to mass incarceration, structural racism and poverty. The ad was posted to YouTube on April 20, 2017, in recognition of 4/20.

Personal life
Cook married actor Daniel Gillies on August 8, 2004, whom she had dated since 2001. They have two children: a daughter born September 2013 and a son born April 2015. The couple separated in June 2019 and divorced in 2021.

Filmography

Film

Television

Music videos

Video games

Awards and nominations

References

External links

 
 
 
 

20th-century American actresses
21st-century American actresses
Actresses from Minneapolis
American child actresses
American film actresses
American people of Italian descent
American television actresses
American video game actresses
American voice actresses
Living people
Hill-McIndoe-Gillies family
South High School (Minnesota) alumni
1979 births